Snooki & Jwoww, sometimes rendered Snooki & JWoww or Snooki & JWOWW in print and online sources, is an American reality television series on MTV starring Nicole "Snooki" Polizzi and Jennifer "JWoww" Farley, a spinoff of Jersey Shore. The first season featured Polizzi and Farley living together in a former firehouse in Jersey City, New Jersey. A second season was confirmed on August 3, 2012. The format expanded to one hour, and was filmed in Manchester, New Jersey. It premiered January 8, 2013. MTV confirmed a third season on April 25, 2013. On October 8, 2014, MTV confirmed season 4 will be the final season of the series. The Fourth and final season premiered on Wednesday, November 5 at 10/9c.

The series ran for 48 episodes over four seasons from June 21, 2012 until February 4, 2015.

Series overview

Episodes

Season 1 (2012)

Season 2 (2013)

Season 3 (2013–14)
On April 25, 2013, MTV renewed the series for a third season. The season premiered on October 22, 2013, and lasted 13 episodes.

Season 4 (2014–15)
On April 24, 2014, MTV renewed Snooki & JWoww for a fourth and final season.

References

External links

Jersey Shore (TV series)
Lists of American reality television series episodes